In molecular biology, miR-148 is a microRNA whose expression has been demonstrated in human (MI0000253), mouse (MI0000550), rat (MI0000616) and zebrafish (MI0002015).  miR-148 has also been predicted in chicken (MI0001189).

These predicted hairpin precursor sequence are related to those of miR-152, which has been expressed in mouse (MI0000174) and is predicted in human (MI0000462).

The hairpin precursors (represented here) are predicted based on base pairing and cross-species conservation; their extents are not known.  In this case, the mature sequence is excised from the 3' arm of the hairpin.

Targets of miR-148

MicroRNAs act by lowering the expression of genes by binding to target sites in the 3' UTR of the mRNAs. However recently it was shown by Duursma and colleagues that miR-148 down regulates Dnmt3b by binding to a region in the protein coding region.

References

External links
 
 miRBase family page

MicroRNA
MicroRNA precursor families